There are several series of subdivisions of Sweden.

 Judiciary
 Supreme Court (Högsta Domstolen), Supreme Administrative Court (Högsta förvaltningsdomstolen)
 Courts of appeal (hovrätter), administrative courts of appeal (kammarrätter) (and historically: lagsagor)
 District courts (tingsrätter), county administrative courts (länsrätter)
 Central executive
 Cabinet of Sweden, Government agencies in Sweden
 County administrative boards of Sweden
 Local government
 Regions of Sweden (regioner)
 Municipalities of Sweden (kommuner)
 City districts of Sweden (stadsdelar or stadsdelsnämndsområden)
 Ecclesiastically
 Church of Sweden
 Dioceses (stift)
 Kontrakt
 Pastorat
 Parishes (församlingar)
 Historically
 Lands of Sweden
 Provinces of Sweden
 Hundreds of Sweden
 Socknar (both parishes and rural municipalities)
 Proposed
 Regions of Sweden

See also
Subdivisions of the Nordic countries
NUTS statistical regions of Sweden

References 

 
Sweden
Sweden